These names are examples of reduplication, a common theme in Australian toponymy, especially in names derived from Indigenous Australian languages such as Wiradjuri. Reduplication is often used as an intensifier such as "Wagga Wagga" many crows and "Tilba Tilba" many waters.

The phenomenon has been the subject of interest in popular culture, including the song by Australian folk singer Greg Champion (written by Jim Haynes and Greg Champion), Don't Call Wagga Wagga Wagga. British comedian Spike Milligan, an erstwhile resident of Woy Woy, once wrote "Woy it is called Woy Woy Oi will never know".

Place names

See also 
 Reduplication for general linguistic analysis
 List of reduplicated place names
 List of reduplicated New Zealand place names
 List of Australian place names of Aboriginal origin
 List of tautological place names
 Postcodes

References

Further reading 
 Kennedy, Brian, & Kennedy, Barbara. & Australian Broadcasting Corporation. (2006)  Australian place names  ABC Books for the Australian Broadcasting Corporation, Sydney, N.S.W. 
 Reed, A. W. (1967) Aboriginal place names Sydney ; Wellington : A.H. & A.W. Reed.  (pbk)

External links 
 Double Barrelled Place Names in Australia

Australia geography-related lists
Lists of place names
Australian place names
Names of places in Australia
Indigenous toponymy
Australian toponymy